Color mapping is a function that maps (transforms) the colors of one (source) image to the colors of another (target) image. A color mapping may be referred to as the algorithm that results in the mapping function or the algorithm that transforms the image colors. Color mapping is also sometimes called color transfer or, when grayscale images are involved, brightness transfer function (BTF); it may also be called photometric camera calibration or radiometric camera calibration.

The term color mapping is a bit of a misnomer since most common algorithms transfer both color and shading. (Indeed, the example shown on this page predominantly transfers shading other than a small orange region within the image that is adjusted to yellow.)

Algorithms 
There are two types of color mapping algorithms: those that employ the statistics of the colors of two images, and those that rely on a given pixel correspondence between the images.

An example of an algorithm that employs the statistical properties of the images is histogram matching. This is a classic algorithm for color mapping, but it can suffer from the problem that it is too precise so that it copies very particular color quirks from the source image, rather than the general color characteristics, giving rise to color artifacts. Newer statistic-based algorithms deal with this problem. An example of such algorithm is adjusting the mean and the standard deviation of Lab channels of the two images.

A common algorithm for computing the color mapping when the pixel correspondence is given is building the joint-histogram (see also co-occurrence matrix) of the two images and finding the mapping by using dynamic programming based on the joint-histogram values.

When the pixel correspondence is not given and the image contents are different (due to different point of view), the statistics of the image corresponding regions can be used as an input to statistics-based algorithms, such as histogram matching. The corresponding regions can be found by detecting the corresponding features.

Applications 
Color mapping can serve two different purposes: one is calibrating the colors of two cameras for further processing using two or more sample images, the second is adjusting the colors of two images for perceptual visual compatibility.

Color calibration is an important pre-processing task in computer vision applications. Many applications simultaneously process two or more images and, therefore, need their colors to be calibrated. Examples of such applications are: Image differencing, registration, object recognition, multi-camera tracking, co-segmentation and stereo reconstruction.

Other applications of color mapping have been suggested.  These include the co-option of color palettes from recognised sources such as famous paintings and the use as a further alternative to color modification methods commonly found in commercial image processing applications such as ‘posterise’, ‘solarise’ and ‘gradient’.   A web application has been made available to explore these possibilities.

See also 
 List of colors
 Color chart
 Color management
 ICC profile
 IT8
 Optical transfer function

References 

Image processing
Color
Digital imaging